The FIBT World Championships 1990 took place in St. Moritz, Switzerland (Bobsleigh) and Königssee, West Germany (Skeleton). St. Moritz hosted a championship event for the record seventeenth time. The Swiss city had hosted the event previously in 1931 (Four-man), 1935 (Four-man), 1937 (Four-man), 1938 (Two-man), 1939 (Two-man), 1947, 1955, 1957, 1959, 1965, 1970, 1974, 1977, 1982, 1987, and 1989 (Skeleton). Meanwhile, Königssee hosted a championship event for the third time, doing so previously in 1979 and 1986.

Two man bobsleigh

Four-man bobsleigh

A controversy was created when Weder was caught overnight by officials scraping off ice at a difficult corner of the track. Bobsleigh officials allowed him to compete, and he won his first world championship in the four-man event.

Men's skeleton

Medal table

References
2-Man bobsleigh World Champions
4-Man bobsleigh World Champions
Men's skeleton World Champions
Wallechinsky, David and Jaime Loucky (2009). "Bobsleigh: Two-Man". In The Complete Book of the Winter Olympics: 2010 Edition. London: Aurum Press Limited. p. 159.

1990
1990 in Swiss sport
Sport in St. Moritz
1990 in bobsleigh
1990 in skeleton
International sports competitions hosted by Switzerland
Bobsleigh in Switzerland
International sports competitions hosted by West Germany
Bobsleigh in Germany
1990 in German sport
Skeleton in Germany